Yamady (Yamaźı) is a rural locality (a selo) and the administrative centre of Yamadinsky Selsoviet, Yanaulsky District, Bashkortostan, Russia. The population was 482 as of 2010. There are 12 streets.

Geography 
Yamady is located 34 km southeast of Yanaul (the district's administrative centre) by road. Chetyrman is the nearest rural locality.

References 

Rural localities in Yanaulsky District